The Wheeler National Wildlife Refuge is a 35,000 acre (142 km2) National Wildlife Refuge located along the Tennessee River near Decatur, Alabama. Named after Major General Joseph Wheeler, it was established to provide a habitat for wintering and migrating birds in the eastern United States.

Of the 35,000 acres (142 km2) of the refuge, about 4,085 acres (16.5 km2) are located within Redstone Arsenal. Approximately 1,500 acres (6 km2) of the Redstone Arsenal land is administered by the Marshall Space Flight Center. The facility has a sixteen-person staff with a $1,694,000 annual budget.

Wheeler NWR is charged with the administration of four other National Wildlife Refuges including Fern Cave, Key Cave, Sauta Cave, and the Watercress Darter National Wildlife Refuge. Until recently, Wheeler NWR also administered the Cahaba River National Wildlife Refuge (now administered by the Mountain Longleaf National Wildlife Refuge).

History

In 1934, the Tennessee Valley Authority began purchasing land as a bed for and buffer strip for Wheeler Reservoir. By 1936, the Tennessee River was impounded for flood control with the nearby Wheeler Dam providing hydroelectric power.

In 1938, the Refuge was established by Executive Order of President Franklin D. Roosevelt and became the first National Wildlife Refuge to be overlain on a multi-purpose reservoir. TVA impounded shallow backwater areas of the reservoir to control the mosquito population. By pumping these areas dry in the spring and summer, the mosquito breeding habitat was eliminated.

These impounded areas also produced natural waterfowl foods such as wild millet, smartweed, sedges, and other seed bearing grasses that attracted waterfowl when the area was re-flooded in the winter. This food source allows the Refuge to be the home of Alabama's largest duck population as well as its only significant concentration of wintering Canada geese.

In 1940, a presidential proclamation renamed Wheeler Migratory Waterfowl Refuge to its present name.

In 1941, for national security reasons, about 4,085 acres (16.5 km2) were included inside the Redstone Arsenal boundary. Currently, about 1,500 acres (6 km2) of the 4,085 acres (16.5 km2) is administered by NASA's Marshall Space Flight Center.

Topography
Located along the Tennessee River, the refuge provides a mix of bottomland hardwoods, mixed hardwood and pine uplands, shallow water embayments, and agricultural fields. Of the Refuge's 35,000 acres (142 km2), there are 19,000 acres (77 km2) of land and 16,000 acres (65 km2) of water. The area consists of some 10,000 acres (40 km2) of forested wetlands and upland hardwoods, with main species consisting of red and white oaks, hickories, poplar, ash, and tupelo; 3,000 acres (12 km2) of pine plantations, much of this subjected to sanitation cuts in the mid-1990s due to Ips beetle and pine beetle infestations; and 4,000 to 5,000 acres (16 to 20 km2) of farmland, with the remainder including open shelves, rocket test ranges, and other areas. This mix of habitat provides for a wealth of wildlife diversity on the refuge.

Wildlife and protected species
Wheeler NWR has supported up to 60,000 geese and 100,000 ducks, although recently these levels have declined to approximately 30,000 geese and 60,000 ducks. Since 1990, winter goose populations have dropped significantly due to many different factors; below 15,000 from 1990 to 1995 and about 2,500-5,500 in the last few years. Snow geese are now the most prominent component of the winter goose population, peaking near 1,500-3,200 in recent years.

In addition to migratory birds, the refuge hosts 115 species of fish, 74 species of reptiles and amphibians, 47 species of mammals, and 288 different species of songbirds. Some common mammals include squirrels, raccoons, opossums, rabbits, quail, and deer. Approximately ten endangered species which live on the refuge. There is also a small population of American alligators present within the reserve; they were reintroduced into the area following historical extirpation from northern Alabama.

Facilities

Additionally, six improved boat launch areas provide access to the Tennessee River.

Hunting and fishing
Fishing is very popular at Wheeler NWR with an estimated 200,000 annual visitors. The Tennessee River provides excellent fishing opportunities for bass, sunfish, crappie, sauger, and catfish. Public hunting is permitted on approximately 18,000 acres (73 km2).

Wildlife observation

The main visitor center provides an overlook of a waterfowl impoundment for birdwatching as well as  the opportunity to see a red-tailed hawk. Several other spotting scope stations are set up throughout the refuge. Additionally, a wildlife observation tower is located on the north side of the Refuge and provides an elevated view of the Beaverdam peninsula, an area of the Refuge managed primarily for Canada geese. Each winter, the area is filled with thousands of Sandhill Cranes. The endangered Whooping Crane has been spotted regularly each winter for the last decade, sometimes numbering over 10. Over 200 species of birds have been identified here on the EBird Hotspot list.

Wheeler NWR has eight sites on North Alabama Birding Trail, which is the most sites on the trail within any public land area.

Annual events

 March: Federal Junior Duck Stamp Contest.
 May: Youth Fishing Rodeo, FAWN Festival.
 Summer: Wheeler Day Camps.
 August: United Way's Day of Caring Fishing Rodeo.
 October: Wet and Wild Festival, Southern Wildlife Festival.

See also
 List of National Wildlife Refuges

References

External links
 Wheeler National Wildlife Refuge homepage
 FWS profile of Wheeler NWR
 
 Recreation.gov overview

Tennessee River
Decatur, Alabama
Decatur metropolitan area, Alabama
Huntsville-Decatur, AL Combined Statistical Area
Protected areas of Limestone County, Alabama
Protected areas of Madison County, Alabama
Protected areas of Morgan County, Alabama
National Wildlife Refuges in Alabama
Nature centers in Alabama
Wetlands of Alabama
Landforms of Limestone County, Alabama
Landforms of Madison County, Alabama
Landforms of Morgan County, Alabama
1938 establishments in Alabama
Protected areas established in 1938